Major O. "Mike" Palmer (February 2, 1890 – March 16, 1972) was a player in the National Football League. He played with the Minneapolis Marines during the 1921 NFL season.

References

People from Columbia County, Wisconsin
Players of American football from Wisconsin
Minneapolis Marines players
1890 births
1972 deaths